Jeannine Baker is an Australian historian. She specialises in women's, labour and media history and is a research fellow at Macquarie University, Sydney.

Life 
Baker completed a BA in Mass Communications from Macquarie University and an MA in Public History at the University of Technology, Sydney. She completed a PhD in Australian history at the University of Melbourne in 2014. Her thesis, on Australian women war reporters during World War II, was later published as Australian Women War Reporters: Boer War to Vietnam.

Baker has also worked as an oral history interviewer and made historical documentaries including Our Drowned Town (SBS TV, 2001) about the flooding of the New South Wales town of Adaminaby for the Snowy Mountains Scheme and Holding a Tiger by the Tail: Jessie Litchfield (Earshot, ABC Radio National, 2015), about the Darwin newspaper editor and journalist Jessie Litchfield.

Jeannine Baker was a recipient of the International Federation of Television Archives Media Studies Grant in 2021, which she used to conduct research and publish about the role of women in early Australian television production.

Publications
 Baker, J. Australian Women War Reporters: Boer War to Vietnam. Sydney: NewSouth, 2015
 Arrow M, Baker J, and Monagle C (eds), Small Screens: Essays in Contemporary Australian Television. Melbourne: Monash University Press, 2016.

References

Living people
Year of birth missing (living people)
Academic staff of Macquarie University
21st-century Australian historians
Macquarie University alumni
University of Melbourne alumni
University of Technology Sydney alumni
Oral historians
Australian documentary filmmakers